Kulasekarapuram is a village is near to the Osaravillai in Kanniyakumari district in the Indian state of Tamil Nadu.

Demographics
 India census, Kulasekarapuram had a population of 2,853. Males constitute 49.2% of the population and females 50.8%. In Kulasekarapuram, 9.6% of the population is under 6 years of age.

References

Villages in Kanyakumari district